Martti Samuel Jylhä (born 3 June 1987) is a Finnish cross-country skier.

Cross-country skiing results
All results are sourced from the International Ski Federation (FIS).

Olympic Games

World Championships

World Cup

Season standings

Individual podiums
1 podium – (1 )

References

External links

1987 births
Cross-country skiers at the 2014 Winter Olympics
Cross-country skiers at the 2018 Winter Olympics
Living people
Olympic cross-country skiers of Finland
Finnish male cross-country skiers
People from Sotkamo
Sportspeople from Kainuu
21st-century Finnish people